The Kfar Chabad railway station is a railway station in the central Israeli village of Kfar Chabad. The station lies between Lod and Tel Aviv HaHagana. It is served by trains on the line between Binyamina and Ashkelon. The town of Kfar Chabad is a Chasidic town affiliated with the Chabad movement. The station was constructed in 1952 in place of the old Palestine Railways halt which used to serve the village of Al-Safiriyya. In 1999, as part of double-tracking the Tel-Aviv—Lod railway, Kfar Habad station had been rebuilt. The station is operated by the country's national rail operator, Israel Railways.

References

Railway stations in Central District (Israel)
Railway stations opened in 1891
Railway stations closed in 1948
Railway stations opened in 1952
1952 establishments in Israel
Transport in Tel Aviv